Mother, Don't Rush Me is a 1936 British comedy film directed by Norman Lee and starring Robb Wilton, Muriel Aked and Peter Haddon. It was made at the Riverside Studios in Hammersmith. It is based on a sketch by the celebrated music hall performer Fred Karno, who produced the film.

Cast
 Robb Wilton as Samuel Honey  
 Muriel Aked as Amy Andrews  
 Peter Haddon as Adolphe
 Clay Keyes as Detective  
 Frank Tully as Detective    
 Bobbie Comber as Louis  
 Kathleen Kelly as Tilly 
 Kenneth Kove as Bertie Moon  
 Wallace Douglas as Jack Honey 
 Dino Galvani as Tony  
 Hal Walters as Hal  
 Nor Kiddie as Commissionaire 
 Wilson Coleman

References

Bibliography
 Low, Rachael. Filmmaking in 1930s Britain. George Allen & Unwin, 1985.
 Wood, Linda. British Films, 1927-1939. British Film Institute, 1986.

External links

1936 films
British comedy films
1936 comedy films
1930s English-language films
Films directed by Norman Lee
Films set in England
Films shot at Riverside Studios
British black-and-white films
1930s British films